List of Water Ski World Championships champions.

Results

List of Ski Racing World champions

List of Cable Ski World champions - Men & Women

See also
 Water skiing
 List of Water Skiing European Champions
 List of Water Skiing Under-21 European Champions
 List of Water Skiing Under-17 European Champions

References

Male professional water skiers
Water Ski World Championships
Water Ski World Championships